Dargins or Dargwa (darganti) are a Northeast Caucasian native ethnic group originating in the North Caucasus, and who make up the second largest ethnic group in the North Caucasian republic of Dagestan. They speak the Dargwa language. The ethnic group comprises, however, all speakers of the Dargin languages; Dargwa is simply the standard variety.

According to the 2002 Census, Dargins make up 16.5% of the population of Dagestan, with 425,526 people. They are concentrated in the Kaytagsky District, Dakhadayevsky District, Levashinsky District, Akushinsky District and Sergokalinsky Districts.

The Dargins have lived in their present-day location for many centuries. They formed the state of Kaitag in the Middle Ages and Renaissance until Russian conquest. Today, the Dargins are one of the most numerous ethnic groups in Dagestan (an amalgamation of many of the historical peoples in the region), the second most numerous after Avars.

Origin
Regarding the origin of Northeast caucasian peoples, two hypotheses were put forward — the autochthonous one (developed in the works of M.G. Abdushelishvili, V. P. Alekseev, etc.), arguing for an indigenous origin and the migration one (proposed by G. F. Debets), arguing for an exogenous origin.

Culture
The Infrastructure/Architecture of the Dargin people was extremely well developed compared to their neighbors throughout history. The folk masters of this art displayed a very high level of achievement in building and ornamenting towers and fortresses, building the ensembles of buildings, mosques, bridges, and building irrigation constructions at springs and wells. The artistry of the Dargins is clearly shown in their decorative and applied art: in the creations of the Kubachi silversmiths; in the work of stonecutters, toolmakers, woodworkers, and ceramic and tile workers; in weaving, leatherwork, and furwork; and in spirited folk dance and vocal music. Dargins are known for their Kaitag textiles, from Kaytagsky District. Spiritual and religious center of Dargin nation was Akusha-Dargo. The head judicial court of all Dargins was also in Akusha. Other famous Dargin cities were Levashi, Mekegi, Kubachi and Kadar.

Prior to Russia's annexation of Dargi regions, Dargi medicine was a combination of folk and Eastern medicine. Folk healers (khakim) achieved considerable success in the treatment of wounds, bruises, broken bones, and dislocations and even in trephination; they were also skilled in phytotherapy and treatment of various internal diseases. The best-known healers were Murtuzali Haji of Butri, who studied medicine in Cairo for five years, worked with the Russian surgeon N. I. Pirogov, and was given a set of surgical instruments by him; Taimaz of Urakhi; Mohammed Haji of Khajalmakhi; Davud Haji of Akusha'; Alisultan Haji of Urkarakh; and others. Medical service was instituted only in 1894, with nine doctors and twelve nurses for all of Dagestan, a ratio of one medical practitioner to 60,000 persons. Now there is a paramedical station in every settled place, or a regional doctor, or a regional, district, or interdistrict hospital and a first-aid service with its own transport, including air transport.

Religion 
Dargins are majority Sunni of the Shafi'i school, with a minority professing Ja'fari Shi'ism. Islam began making headway among the Dargins since at least the 15th century. By the 19th century, most Dargins were Muslims and are known today as being very devout.
Dargin religious beliefs focus on divine mission of Dhulqarnayn who closed the gates and saved the world from Gog and Magog. Dargin legends talk about Dargins assisting Dhulqarnayn in his great cause. Also in the Dargin tradition any connection with demons, genies or spirits is extremely dangerous and never leads to any positive result. However unlike in the Christian tradition, the Dargin traditions demons are powerless against pious men and are afraid of them. Some Dargin demons are: Simsir, Hazab and more.

Famous Dargins
Ilyas Umakhanov, the deputy of Russian Senate.
Magomed-Ali Magomedov, ex-president of Dagestan.
Magomedsalam Magomedov, ex-president of Dagestan.
Magomed-Shapi Suleymanov, footballer.
Rinat Karimov, singer.
Patimat Kagirova, singer.
Rabadonov Murtuzali, rector of Dagestan State University.
Shahbulat Shamhalaev, retired mixed martial artist and kickboxer
Magomedrasul Medzhidov, olympic and professional boxer

References 

Dargwa people
Muslim communities of Russia
Peoples of the Caucasus
Muslim communities of the Caucasus